In mathematics the Lawrence–Krammer representation is a representation of the braid groups.  It fits into a family of representations called the Lawrence representations.  The first Lawrence representation is the Burau representation and the second is the Lawrence–Krammer representation.

The Lawrence–Krammer representation is named after Ruth Lawrence and Daan Krammer.

Definition 

Consider the braid group  to be the mapping class group of a disc with n marked points, .

The covering space of  corresponding to the kernel of the projection map

is called the Lawrence–Krammer cover and is denoted .

thought of as a

-module,

is the Lawrence–Krammer representation. The group  is known to be a free -module, of rank .

Matrices 

Letting  denote the standard Artin generators of the braid group, we obtain the expression:

Faithfulness 

Stephen Bigelow and Daan Krammer have given independent proofs that the Lawrence–Krammer representation is faithful.

Geometry 

The Lawrence–Krammer representation preserves a non-degenerate sesquilinear form which is known to be negative-definite Hermitian provided  are specialized to suitable unit complex numbers (q near 1 and t near i).  Thus the braid group is a subgroup of the unitary group of square matrices of size . Recently it has been shown that the image of the Lawrence–Krammer representation is a dense subgroup of the unitary group in this case.

The sesquilinear form has the explicit description:

References

Further reading
 
  
 
 
  
 

Braid groups
Representation theory